Khushevash (also Romanized as Khūshevāsh) is a village in Chelav Rural District, in the Central District of Amol County, Mazandaran Province, Iran. At the 2006 census, its population was 27, in 7 families.

References 

Populated places in Amol County